SPC ECO (pronounced Space Echo) are a British shoegaze band formed in 2007.

The band consists of Dean Garcia (bass, drums, guitar and programming), formerly of Curve, and his daughter Rose Berlin (vocals); and a long list of "friends and collaborators" including: Joey Levenson, Perry Pelonero, Jarek Leskiewicz, Debbie Smith, Steve Monti, Harry K G, Preston Maddox, Russell Keeble, Ed Shearmur, Alan Moulder,  Masa at Quince Japan, Julian Baker, Anne Baker, Freddie Lomaz, Slade Templeton, J P Wombbaby, Alex Keevil, Jo Neale, Zac, Laura and Em, Robin Allport, Gary Crowley, Chris McCormack,  Baxter, Merlin Rhys Jones, Chris Rigg, Phill Savidge, Jo Murray, and John Howarrd Fletcher.

Discography
All releases are issued on ELaB Records (aka Eco Lab Recordings), an independent label owned and operated by Dean Garcia; with the exception of the You're Alright / Another Day single issued on Club AC30.

3-D was also released on Noiseplus Music, Quince Records, Electric; and the Silver Clouds EP was released on Electric.

The single "Push" from the Push EP was featured on "BBC London Introducing: The best in new music with Gary Crowley". on 26 January 2013. Crowley commented "We played them before to always a good reaction; Rose likes twisters and Marcel Duchamp, Dean likes eating biscuits and staying up late." A review by Wave Maker Magazine stated "Push is undeniably one of those songs that automatically has the ability to put you into a trance, and for all of the right reasons."

Albums
3-D (2009; 1 January 2010) 
 Alternative Mixes and Remixes (16 September 2010) 
 You Tell Me (1 November 2011) 
 Dark Notes (18 August 2012) 
 Sirens and Satellites (18 September 2013) 
 The Art of Pop (28 June 2014) 
 Dark Matter (3 May 2015) 
 All We Have Is Now (25 March 2016) 
 Anomalies (12 August 2016) 
 Calm (22 August 2017) 
 Fifteen (15 February 2019) 
 6月LP (1 June 2020)
 Day By Day (18 June 2021)
 Times Like These (16 July 2021)
 Be The Change (22 July 2022)

EPs
 Silver Clouds (5 May 2010) 
 Out of the Sky (25 September 2010) 
 Big Fat World (10 May 2011) 
 Don't Say (10 March 2012) 
 Push (12 December 2012) 
Zombie (30 September 2014) 
 Smile (8 July 2015) 
 Favorite Colour (12 August 2016) 
 Ours (17 August 2016)

Singles
 "You're Alright / Another Day" (2007) 
 "Silent Night" (2010) 
 "Ave Verum Corpus" (2011) 
 "Hollow Talk" (2012) 
 "Because" (2013)
 "Fallen Stars" (2013)
 "Delusional Waste" (2013)
 "Fuck You" (2014)
 "2+2=5" (2014)
 "Hear Me Now" (2015)
 "Feel Me" (2015)

Compilation albums
SPC and Time Vol. 1 (2015) 
SPC and Time Vol. 2 (2015)

Remixes
The Art Of Pop Remixes + (2014)

References

External links
 
 

British shoegaze musical groups
English electronic music groups
English indie rock groups
English post-punk music groups
Musical groups established in 2007